Jai Shri Krishna, also rendered Jaya Sri Krishna, is a Sanskrit expression, translating to "Victory to Krishna", a major deity in Hinduism. The salutation is believed to have hailed from the Vaishnavas. The expression is said to greet another person wishing them success, and has also been used as a greeting accompanied with the anjali mudra or bowed head, specially while greeting one's elders. 

Jai Shri Krishna expression is widely used expression to greet people during the Hindu festival of Janmashtami, which celebrates the birth of Krishna. In the present day, Jai Shri Krishna is widely used among the Vaishnava community, Jain community, Gujaratis, and Rajasthanis, based in and out of India.

Legend 
According to popular belief, when the assassins he had dispatched failed to kill Krishna, Kamsa thought to kill him by inviting him to Mathura. On reaching Mathura, Krishna met with one of Kamsa's washermen, requesting a few dresses for his friends who have accompanied him. The soldier on learning that it is Krishna who is in front of him and that he is Kamsa's undeclared enemy, tried to kill Krishna assuming he will be rewarded. Looking at the soldier's failed attempt and Krishna's strength, the crowd accumulated in market poured with slogans on Krishna such as Jai Shri Krishna, along with Jai Shri Balarama and Jai Shri Vasudev, hence glorifying Krishna's brother and father respectively.

Popular culture 
There is a series with the same name aired on Colors TV between 21 July 2008 to 15 September 2009, which itself is a remake of Sri Krishna, which was aired between 1993 to 1997 in Doordarshan and was re-telecasted in 2020.

See also

References 

Hinduism and society
Krishna
Chants
Slogans